The Littletons is the name of a cluster of villages in Worcestershire, England. The title may refer to:

 North and Middle Littleton, a civil parish containing the villages of North and Middle Littleton
 South Littleton, a larger village and civil parish

See also
 Littleton (disambiguation)